The Imus Heritage Park is a memorial park in Imus, Cavite, Philippines commemorating the Battle of Alapan. It is known for the Shrine of the National Flag of the Philippines (Filipino: Dambana ng Pambansang Watawat ng Pilipinas)

The National Historical Commission of the Philippines recognizes the Imus Heritage Park as a National Historic Landmark through Resolution No. 5 of May 26, 1993. The park has also been a venue of National Flag Day commemorations.

It also features a  flagpole, which used to be the old Independence Flagpole in Rizal Park in Manila.
In 2019, a sanctum of Katipunan revolutionary flags was unveiled at the National Flag Shrine. A  sculpture known as the Inang Laya ('Mother of Freedom') was inaugurated the following year.

References

Parks in the Philippines
Buildings and structures in Imus
National Historical Landmarks of the Philippines